The Town of Branson is a Statutory Town located in Las Animas County, Colorado, United States. The town population was 57 at the 2020 United States Census. Branson is the southernmost town in the State of Colorado, located just  from the New Mexico border.

Branson is located approximately 35 miles east of Trinidad, Colorado, on State Highway 389, in the Great Plains, as well in the Black Mesa area, the town is surrounded by mesa. It is a ranching community today. Farming in the area was severely impacted by the dust bowl. Branson is much smaller than it once was in more optimistic days and features some picturesque abandoned buildings.

History
The town was first known as Wilson, or Wilson Switch; then as Coloflats. A post office was established in 1915, and its name was changed to Branson in 1918. The town is named after Josiah F. Branson who platted the town on his land. The town was incorporated in 1921. Branson is located north of a break in the mesas which separate Southeast Colorado from Northeast New Mexico, the route of a minor branch of the Santa Fe Trail. It was founded near a switch, Wilson Switch, of the Denver, Texas, and Fort Worth Railroad, later merged into the Colorado and Southern Railway, a predecessor of today's Burlington Northern Santa Fe. A depot was built in 1918. Despite being unsuitable for farming, many homesteaders attempted dryland farming in the early 20th century. In good years there were bountiful harvests of grain and in the 1920s the town boasted 1000 people and 3 grain elevators as well as facilities such as a bank and a newspaper. After the drought and dust bowl of the 1930s population decreased rapidly as the economy turned from farming to ranching.

Geography
Branson is located at  (37.015291, -103.883684).

Climate

Demographics

As of the census of 2000, there were 77 people, 37 households, and 24 families residing in the town. The racial makeup of the town was 97.40% White, 1.30% Native American, and 1.30% from two or more races. Hispanic or Latino of any race were 19.48% of the population.

There were 37 households, out of which 32.4% had children under the age of 18 living with them, 45.9% were married couples living together, 16.2% had a female householder with no husband present, and 35.1% were non-families. 35.1% of all households were made up of individuals, and 18.9% had someone living alone who was 65 years of age or older. The average household size was 2.08 and the average family size was 2.63.

In the town, the population was spread out, with 26.0% under the age of 18, 1.3% from 18 to 24, 29.9% from 25 to 44, 20.8% from 45 to 64, and 22.1% who were 65 years of age or older. The median age was 42 years. For every 100 females, there were 71.1 males. For every 100 females age 18 and over, there were 62.9 males.

The median income for a household in the town was $24,583, and the median income for a family was $23,214. Males had a median income of $19,167 versus $20,000 for females. The per capita income for the town was $14,933. There were 26.9% of families and 25.0% of the population living below the poverty line, including 33.3% of under eighteens and none of those over 64.

See also

Colorado
Bibliography of Colorado
Index of Colorado-related articles
Outline of Colorado
List of counties in Colorado
List of municipalities in Colorado
List of places in Colorado
Black Mesa

References

History of Branson, Colo. By Odessa M. Booher - Unknown date written - retrieved May 21, 2018

External links

Town of Branson website
CDOT map of the Town of Branson
History, photos and information on Sangres.com
Branson School Online Branson School Online
Branson history
Article in the New York Times on Branson School Online

Towns in Las Animas County, Colorado
Towns in Colorado